2016 Academy Awards may refer to:

 88th Academy Awards, the Academy Awards ceremony that took place in 2016, honoring the best in film for 2015
 89th Academy Awards, the Academy Awards ceremony that took place in 2017, honoring the best in film for 2016